Barbara Schett was the defending champion but lost in the quarterfinals to Emmanuelle Gagliardi.

Patty Schnyder won in the final 6–2, 4–6, 6–3 against Gala León García.

Seeds
A champion seed is indicated in bold text while text in italics indicates the round in which that seed was eliminated.

  Patty Schnyder (champion)
  Sabine Appelmans (first round)
  Barbara Paulus (quarterfinals)
  Barbara Schett (quarterfinals)
  Gala León García (final)
  Sylvia Plischke (quarterfinals)
  Sandra Kleinová (first round)
  Emmanuelle Gagliardi (semifinals)

Draw

External links
 1998 Piberstein Styrian Open draw

WTA Austrian Open
1998 WTA Tour